Nesameletus ornatus, commonly known as the small swimming mayfly, is a species of mayfly in the Nesameletidae family. It is endemic to New Zealand. It was first described by Alfred Edwin Eaton in 1883.

References

Insects described in 1883
Endemic fauna of New Zealand
Insects of New Zealand
Mayflies
Endemic insects of New Zealand